Andrew Charles Benes (born August 20, 1967) is an American former professional baseball player. He played in Major League Baseball as a right-handed pitcher from 1989 to 2002, most prominently as a member of the San Diego Padres where he was named to the National League All-Star team in 1993 and led the league in strikeouts in 1994. He also played for the Seattle Mariners, the St. Louis Cardinals and the Arizona Diamondbacks. His brother Alan Benes also pitched in the Major Leagues, and was his teammate in 1996–97 and 2000–01.

Career
Benes was born in Evansville, Indiana, where he attended Evansville Lutheran School and Evansville Central High School along with his brother Alan. He was the first player selected in the 1988 Major League Baseball draft after playing college baseball at the University of Evansville. Benes pitched well enough in his first year to make it to the majors and be named National League Rookie Pitcher of the Year by The Sporting News. 

Benes was an All-Star in  during a 15–15 season with the Padres, and led the Majors in losses with 14 and in strikeouts with 189 the next season. Benes finished third in the Cy Young Award balloting in  after an 18–10, 3.83 earned run average season. After the 1997 season, Benes agreed to sign a 5-year, $30 million contract to return to the Cardinals. Unfortunately, the contract was signed after the deadline for players to re-sign with their 1997 teams. Benes would then have to wait until May 1 to re-sign. Instead, Benes became one of the first players in Diamondbacks history when he signed as a free agent prior to the  season and threw the first pitch in the history of the franchise.

Benes was primarily a starting pitcher but on May 29, 1996, he picked up his only major league save. He recorded the final out of a 6–5 Cardinals victory over the Rockies to close out the game for the Cardinals. 

In a 2004 column for The Sporting News, pitcher Todd Jones wrote that Benes had a habit of gritting his teeth when preparing to throw a slider, a tell that some hitters exploited.

See also
List of Major League Baseball career strikeout leaders

References

External links

1967 births
Living people
Baseball players from Indiana
Major League Baseball pitchers
San Diego Padres players
Seattle Mariners players
St. Louis Cardinals players
Arizona Diamondbacks players
National League All-Stars
National League strikeout champions
Baseball players at the 1988 Summer Olympics
Sportspeople from Evansville, Indiana
Wichita Wranglers players
Las Vegas Stars (baseball) players
Prince William Cannons players
Arkansas Travelers players
Louisville Redbirds players
Potomac Cannons players
Memphis Redbirds players
Evansville Purple Aces baseball players
Medalists at the 1988 Summer Olympics
Olympic gold medalists for the United States in baseball
All-American college baseball players